James Mursell (1893–1963) wrote extensively about music education and the use of music in a classroom setting. He emphasized the student's role in learning and believed that unless students are intrinsically motivated to learn, their musical growth will be minimal at best. In Mursell's view the best motivator is the active, participatory musical experience—singing, playing, listening and being actively involved with good music. This is the all-important starting point for motivation, and it is from these experiences that musical growth can occur.

He applies his "synthesis-analysis-synthesis" (or whole-part-whole) pattern of learning to music education, and speaks of musical understanding as "unfolding or evolving, rather than adding or accumulating." Instead of teaching the rudiments of music in isolation from the context that gives them meaning, Mursell suggests that factual knowledge about music will gradually be gleaned from songs that students have learned and enjoy singing. Each time they sing a particular song, they do something different with it and learn a little more about it. In this way their understanding of melody, rhythm and dynamics deepens gradually as an outgrowth of meaningful music-making, rather than drill and practice. At the end of each such activity, when students sing the song through once more it means more to them that it did prior to their "analysis" of it.

Publications
Mursell's The Psychology of School Music Teaching (with Kansas City music supervisor Mabelle Glenn) and Human Values and Music Education (both published in the 1930s) became standard texts. "Principles of Music Education" appeared as the opening chapter in the 1936 yearbook of the National Society for the Study of Education, and Mursell was also a contributing author to the 1958 yearbook Basic Concepts in Music Education. In 1955 he published Principles of Democratic Education.In addition, his seminal book Music in American Schools was published in 1943 during World War II.

References

Labuta, J.A. and Smith, D.A. (1997). Music Education: Historical Contexts and Perspectives. Upper Saddle River: Prentice Hall.
Mark, M.L. and Gary, C.L. (1999). A History of American Music Education. Reston: the National Association for Music Education.
Mursell, J.L. (1943). Music In American Schools. New York, NY: Silver Burdett Co.

American educational theorists
1963 deaths
1893 births
20th-century American educators